Vostervatnet is a lake in the municipality of Strand in Rogaland county, Norway. The  lake lies in the northwestern part of Strand, just south of the Fognafjorden. The main outflow of the lake is the river Fiskåna, which flows north from the northeastern corner of the lake, down the hill to the village of Fiskå on the shore of the fjord.

See also
List of lakes in Norway

References

Strand, Norway
Lakes of Rogaland